Etlingera is a genus of Indo-Pacific herbaceous perennial flowering plants in the ginger family, Zingiberaceae, consisting of more than 100 species found in tropical regions of the Old World.

Some of the larger species have leafy shoots reaching almost 10 metres high, and the bases of these shoots are so stout as to seem almost woody.  Others of the species grow as clumps of leafy shoots; while others have such long creeping rhizomes that each of their leafy shoots can be more than a metre apart.

Unique and distinctive to all Etlingera is a tube forming above the point where the base of the flowers petals joins onto the plant (i.e. above the  insertion of the  corolla lobes).

Distribution

Etlingera species are native to India, Bangladesh, Burma, China, Laos, Cambodia, Vietnam, Thailand, Malaysia, Singapore, Indonesia, Philippines, Brunei, Papua New Guinea, Queensland, and several Pacific Islands, predominantly close to the equator between sea level and 2500 metres. Members of the genus are also reportedly naturalized in other warm places (Hawaii, Puerto Rico, Trinidad, Central America, Mauritius, and the islands of the Gulf of Guinea.

Species

The most commonly known species of Etlingera is the torch ginger (E. elatior), also called the torch lily, porcelain rose, or Philippine waxflower because of its showy inflorescence. The described species include:

Ethnobotany
Species of Etlingera are widely used for many different purposes and many of the species are therefore locally named and known.

A common use is to pull out and eat the inner sheathes of the leafy shoots of some species: to eat either raw, cooked as a vegetable, or as a condiment (much in the same way as onions are used as a condiment). E. coccinea (known as tuhau in Sabah; no English name) and E. elatior (torch ginger) are especially cultivated for this purpose.

The aromatic sweet and sour fruits are also commonly eaten. Several species are used as medicines to treat headaches or stomachaches. One species which itself has large distinctive red patches, (E. brevilabrumin), is commonly applied externally, to relieve itching and other skin problems.

Other uses made of various Etlingera species include ingredients in local perfumes, ingredients in local shampoos, and making mats, etc. In Borneo, a study of 40 species of Etlingera found more than 70% of these species had alternative local names, and more than 60% had at least one use amongst local peoples.

References

 
Zingiberaceae genera